William George Bryson (24 February 1898 – 2 March 1973) was an Australian  politician for the Australian Labor Party from 1943 to 1946 and 1949 to 1955 and helped establish the Democratic Labor Party.

Bryson won the House of Representatives seat of Bourke at the 1943 election, but was beaten by the independent Doris Blackburn at the 1946 election.  Bourke was abolished prior to the 1949 election and partly replaced by Wills and Bryson defeated Blackburn at the election.  In 1955, Bryson and six other Victorian federal members were expelled from the Labor Party as members of the Industrial Groups.  In April 1955, they established the Australian Labor Party (Anti-Communist), which was renamed the Democratic Labor Party in 1957.  Bryson was beaten by the Labor candidate, Gordon Bryant at the 1955 election.

Bryson was the treasurer of the Carlton Football Club from 1927 to 1943. 

He died on 2 March 1973, in Coburg, aged 75.

Notes

Australian Labor Party members of the Parliament of Australia
Democratic Labour Party members of the Parliament of Australia
Members of the Australian House of Representatives for Bourke
Members of the Australian House of Representatives for Wills
Members of the Australian House of Representatives
1898 births
1973 deaths
20th-century Australian politicians